9900 may refer to:

 A.D. 9900, a year in the 10th millennium CE
 9900 BCE, a year in the 10th millennium BC
 Volvo 9900, a motor coach bus
 BlackBerry Bold 9900, a touchscreen smartphone
 Vermont Route 9900, a state highway
 9900 Llull, an asteroid in the Asteroid Belt, the 9900th asteroid registered; see List_of_minor_planets:_9001–10000

See also

 
 990 (disambiguation)
 900 (disambiguation)
 90 (disambiguation)